Nadora is a village at one end of the North Goa taluka, or sub-district, of Bardez.  It is divided by the Colvale river from the northernmost Goa taluka of Pernem or Pednem.  It lies between Pirna to its east, and Revora to its west.

Area, population

Nadora covers an area of 509.96 hectares. It has a total of 295 households within its village area. In all 1,257 persons live in Nadora, comprising 648 males and 609 females. There are 120 children aged under six, 59 boys and 61 girls, according to the 2011 Census.

Flooding, waterlogging in 2019

In 2019, the Revora-Nadora area was in the news after an island called the Raneache Juvem in the locality flooded due to torrential rain.

Incessant water-logging was also reported during 2019 in the village.

References

Cities and towns in North Goa district